Japan competed at the 2002 Winter Olympics in Salt Lake City, United States.

Medalists

Alpine skiing

Men

Women

Biathlon

Men

Men's 4 × 7.5 km relay

Women

Women's 4 × 7.5 km relay

 1 A penalty loop of 150 metres had to be skied per missed target. 
 2 Starting delay based on 10 km sprint results. 
 3 One minute added per missed target. 
 4 Starting delay based on 7.5 km sprint results.

Bobsleigh

Men

Cross-country skiing

Men
Sprint

Pursuit

 1 Starting delay based on 10 km C. results. 
 C = Classical style, F = Freestyle

4 × 10 km relay

Women
Sprint

Pursuit

 2 Starting delay based on 5 km C. results. 
 C = Classical style, F = Freestyle

4 × 5 km relay

Curling

Women's tournament

Group stage

|}

Contestants

Figure skating

Men

Women

Freestyle skiing

Men

Women

Luge

Men

(Men's) Doubles

Women

Nordic combined 

Men's sprint

Events:
 large hill ski jumping
 7.5 km cross-country skiing 

Men's individual

Events:
 normal hill ski jumping
 15 km cross-country skiing 

Men's Team

Four participants per team.

Events:
 normal hill ski jumping
 5 km cross-country skiing

Short track speed skating

Men

Women

Skeleton

Men

Women

Ski jumping 

Men's team large hill

 1 Four teams members performed two jumps each.

Snowboarding

Men's halfpipe

Women's parallel giant slalom

Women's halfpipe

Speed skating

Men

Women

References
Official Olympic Reports
International Olympic Committee results database
Japan Olympic Committee database
 Olympic Winter Games 2002, full results by sports-reference.com

Nations at the 2002 Winter Olympics
2002
Winter Olympics